Nupatik, also known as Lubadag, was a Hurrian god of uncertain character. He is attested in the earliest inscriptions from Urkesh, as well as in texts from many other Hurrian settlements, and possibly continued to be worshiped as late as in the neo-Assyrian period. However, his functions remain uncertain.

Name
Nupatik s name is attested for the first time inscriptions of Hurrian king Tish-atal of Urkesh, where it is spelled syllabically as dLu-ba-da-ga,  rather than logographically, like these of other Hurrian gods in the same inscription.

Numerous spellings of the name are known,  including dNu-pa-ti-ik, dLu-pa-ki-ta, dNu-ú-pa-ti-ga, dNu-pa-da-ak, and more. He is also present in Hurrian texts from Ugarit, where his name is spelled in the local alphabetic script as nbdg (𐎐𐎁𐎄𐎂).

Both the meaning and origin of his name are unknown.

Character and attributes
Nupatik was one of the "pan-Hurrian" gods, and as such was worshiped by various Hurrian communities across the ancient Near East, similar to Teshub, Shaushka or Kumarbi, but his character, functions and genealogy are unknown. He is also absent from known Hurrian myths. 

According to one ritual text the items offered to Nupatik were a bow, arrows and a quiver. Gianni Marchesi and Nicolò Marchetti propose that he was a warrior god based on this evidence. This view is also supported by Volkert Haas, who notes that he belonged to a triad of gods which also included Ugur (under the epithet Šaummatar) and Aštabi, known for their warlike character.

According to hittitologist Piotr Taracha, Nupatik was regarded as a member of the category of Anatolian tutelary gods in Hurro-Hittite contexts. While it is accepted that the logogram dLAMMA might refer to him in some cases, the dLAMMA known from one of the myths belonging to the Kumarbi Cycle is likely Karḫuḫi, a tutelary god from Carchemish.

Manfred Krebernik notes that in one of the Hurrian ritual texts from Ugarit (CAT 1.125) Nupatik appears to play the role of psychopomp, a deity leading the dead to the afterlife.

Worship 
Nupatik was venerated in 3rd millennium BCE in Urkesh under the name Lubadag. Hurrian king (endan) Tish-atal of Urkesh mentions him in a curse formula, alongside Belet Nagar and Hurrian deities such as Šimige. The curse is part of a longer inscription commemorating the erection of a temple of Nergal.

In a list of offerings to gods from the circle of Teshub (so-called kaluti) from Kizzuwatna, Nupatik appears between Aštabi and Shaushka. In other such lists, he is placed between Aštabi and the war god Ḫešui. Figure 32 from the procession of gods from Yazılıkaya, which arranged deities similarly to such documents, might represent him. 

During the Kizzuwatnean hišuwa festival, meant to guarantee good fortune for the royal couple, two gods named Nupatik (pibithi - "of Pibid(a)" and zalmathi - "of Zalman(a)/Zalmat") were venerated alongside "Teshub Manuzi," Lelluri, Allani, Ishara and Maliya. Both of these epithets have Hurrian origin, though the locations they refer to are otherwise unknown. Pibithi might be connected to Bbt, name of a "god of the house" mentioned in a single Ugaritic ritual text. Manfred Krebernik instead suggests that bbt might refer to a place name, Bibibta, which in texts from Ugarit appears as a location associated with the worship of Nupatik and, more commonly, Resheph. In another ritual (KUB 20.74 i 3–7, KBo 15.37 ii 29–33) both Nupatik gods were also associated with Adamma and Kubaba.

Locations in Kizzuwatna where Nupatik was worshiped include Parnašša and Pišani. 

A single Ugaritic personal name with Nubadig as a theophoric element is known. Wilfred H. van Soldt notes that it did not belong to a foreigner, but to a local inhabitant.

In Middle Bronze Age Carchemish Nupatik was known under the name Nubandag, and was one of the most commonly worshiped deities of the city, alongside Nergal and Kubaba. A letter from the merchant Ishtaran-Nasir to king Zimri-Lim of Mari mentions that at one point, a festival of Nubandag took priority over mourning the death of king Aplahanda, and the latter event were only revealed to his subjects and foreigners present in the city after it ended.

Proposed identification with other deities 
Suggestions that Nupatik can be identified with the Mesopotamian war god Zababa can be found in literature, but according to Gernot Wilhelm this assumption is incorrect, and the latter corresponded to Ḫešui instead in the Hurrian pantheon. 

Jean-Marie Durand proposed that "Nubandag" (Nupatik) worshiped in Carchemish according to texts from Mari is to be identified with Nergal, but Gianni Marchesi and Nicolò Marchetti reject this theory due to Nupatik and Nergal being distinct deities in Hurrian sources, such as inscriptions of Tish-atal.

It is commonly assumed that Umbidaki, a god worshiped in the temple of Ishtar of Arbela in Neo-Assyrian times, was analogous to Nupatik. It is possible that he was introduced to Arbela after a statue of him was seized in a war by the Assyrians. Ninatta and Kulitta, who also were Hurrian deities in origin, were worshiped in the same location.

References

Bibliography

Hurrian deities
Hittite deities
Ugaritic deities
Tutelary deities